Fernand Lataste (1847 - 1934) was a French zoologist and herpetologist born in Cadillac, Gironde. 

From 1880 to 1884 he collected reptiles and amphibians in North Africa (Algeria, Tunisia and Morocco), publishing "Les missions scientifiques de Fernand Lataste en Afrique noire et au Maghreb". In 1885 he released "Étude de la faune des vertébrés de Barbarie", a standard work on animals of North Africa. Other publications by Lataste are:
Essai d'une faune herpétologique de la Gironde, 1876 - Essay on the herpetological fauna of Gironde.
Étude sur le discoglosse, 1879 - Study of Discoglossus.
Notes prises au jour le jour sur différentes espèces de l'ordre des rongeurs observées en captivité, 1886. - Notes taken on a daily basis involving different species of rodents observed in captivity.
Liste de mollusques du Chili : lettre à M. Fernand Lataste, 1896 - List of mollusks native to Chile.

In 1876 he was a founding member of the Société zoologique de France.

Taxonomy
Lataste was the taxonomic author of numerous genera and species, as an example, in 1880 he described the fat-tailed gerbil (Pachyuromys duprasi ). 

Along with Lataste's viper (Vipera latastei ), a viper from Spain, Portugal and North Africa, his name is associated with the following:
Lataste's gerbil (Gerbillus latastei );
Lataste's gundi, often referred to as the Mzab gundi, (Massoutiera mzabi );
Lataste's snake skink (Ophiomorus latastii );
Lataste's lizard (Timon pater );
Latastia, a genus of lacertid lizards;
Lataste's frog (Rana latastei) which inhabits the plains of Northern Italy, the southern tip of Switzerland, Slovenia and Croatia.

References

External links
Fernand Lataste's "Bibliography of Scientific Publications", c. 1880-1890 from the Smithsonian Institution Archives

French zoologists
1847 births
1934 deaths
French herpetologists
People from Gironde